Drumbeg could refer to:

 Drumbeg, County Down, Northern Ireland
 Drumbeg, Sutherland, Highland, Scotland
 Drumbeg, County Antrim, Northern Ireland, see Belfast Upper#List of civil parishes
 Drumbeg, County Donegal, Republic of Ireland, see Inver#Townlands
 Drumbeg Provincial Park, British Columbia, Canada
 1991 Drumbeg killings, County Armagh, Northern Ireland